The Jeff Corwin Experience is an American wildlife documentary television program that premiered on the Animal Planet cable channel in 2000. It was hosted by actor and conservationist Jeff Corwin, who previously hosted Disney Channel's Going Wild with Jeff Corwin.

Overview
In its initial season, the program included a cobra festival in India, jungles in Thailand, Borneo and the Galápagos Islands off the coast of Ecuador in South America. The following year, the program featured Guyana, Australia and Tanzania. In its third season in 2005, Mexico and Peru were included, as well as Kenya and Uganda in Africa. While the program includes some North American settings, segments have included all the other continents except Antarctica.

The program has educational value, but is produced to entertain as well, which would be suitable for science education in state schools. Jeff is often bitten or nearly bitten by the animals being described.  Jeff also enjoys making numerous jokes and references to pop culture and movies.

Corwin was awarded an honorary doctorate degree in public education from Bridgewater State College.  He has long been a proponent of rain forest preservation.  Programs such as this and those of Steve Irwin and Terri Irwin (of The Crocodile Hunter) reflect a "human coexistence with wildlife approach" which is in sharp conflict with poachers and past practices in many parts of the world.

Episodes

Season 1 (2000–01)

Season 2 (2002)

Season 3 (2003)

References

External links
 
 

2000s American documentary television series
2001 American television series debuts
2003 American television series endings
Animal Planet original programming